Ino Dam is a gravity dam located in Fukuoka Prefecture in Japan. The dam is used for flood control and water supply. The catchment area of the dam is 5.5 km2. The dam impounds about 23  ha of land when full and can store 5110 thousand cubic meters of water. The construction of the dam was started on 1979 and completed in 2000.

References

Dams in Fukuoka Prefecture
2000 establishments in Japan